Dayanand Saraswati (born Mula Shankar Tiwari; 12 February 1824 – 30 October 1883), also known as Maharshi Dayanand, was an Indian philosopher, social leader and founder of the Arya Samaj, a reform movement of the Vedic dharma. His magnum opus is the book Satyarth Prakash, which has remained a highly influential text on the philosophy of the Vedas and clarifications of various ideas and duties of human beings. He was the first to give the call for Swaraj as "India for Indians" in 1876, a call later taken up by Lokmanya Tilak. Denouncing the idolatry and ritualistic worship, he worked towards reviving Vedic ideologies. Subsequently, the philosopher and President of India, S. Radhakrishnan, called him one of the "makers of Modern India", as did Sri Aurobindo.
 
Those who were influenced by and followed Dayananda included Madam Cama, Pandit Lekh Ram, Swami Shraddhanand, Shyamji Krishna Varma, Kishan Singh, Bhagat Singh, Vinayak Damodar Savarkar, Bhai Parmanand, Lala Hardayal, Madan Lal Dhingra, Ram Prasad Bismil, Mahadev Govind Ranade, Ashfaq Ullah Khan, Mahatma Hansraj, Lala Lajpat Rai, and Yogmaya Neupane.

He was a sanyasi (ascetic) from boyhood and a scholar. He believed in the infallible authority of the Vedas. Dayananda advocated the doctrine of Karma and Reincarnation. He emphasized the Vedic ideals of brahmacharya, including celibacy and devotion to God.

Among Dayananda's contributions were his promoting of the equal rights for women, such as the right to education and reading of Indian scriptures, and his commentary on the Vedas from Vedic Sanskrit in Sanskrit as well as in Hindi.

Early life 

Dayananda Saraswati was born on the 10th day of waning moon in the month of Purnimanta Phalguna (12 February 1824) on the tithi to an Indian Hindu Brahmin family in Jivapar Tankara, Kathiawad region (now Morbi district of Gujarat). His original name was Mool Shankar Tiwari because he was born in Dhanu Rashi and Mul Nakshatra. His father was Karshanji Lalji Tiwari, and his mother was Yashodabai.

When he was eight years old, his Yajnopavita Sanskara ceremony was performed, marking his entry into formal education. His father was a follower of Shiva and taught him the ways to worship Shiva. He was also taught the importance of keeping fasts. On the occasion of Shivratri, Dayananda sat awake the whole night in obedience to Shiva. During one of these fasts, he saw a mouse eating the offerings and running over the idol's body. After seeing this, he questioned that if Shiva could not defend himself against a mouse, then how could he be the saviour of the world.

The deaths of his younger sister and his uncle from cholera led Dayananda to ponder the meaning of life and death. He began asking questions which worried his parents. He was engaged in his early teens, but he decided marriage was not for him and ran away from home in 1846.

Dayanand Saraswati spent nearly twenty-five years, from 1845 to 1869, as a wandering ascetic, searching for religious truth. He gave up material goods and lived a life of self-denial, devoting himself to spiritual pursuits in forests, retreats in the Himalayan Mountains, and pilgrimage sites in northern India. During these years he practised various forms of yoga and became a disciple of a religious teacher named Virajanand Dandeesha. Virajanand believed that Hinduism had strayed from its historical roots and that many of its practices had become impure. Dayananda Sarasvati promised Virajanand that he would devote his life to restoring the rightful place of the Vedas in the Hindu faith.

Teachings of Dayananda 
Maharshi Dayanand advocated that all Human beings are equally capable of achieving anything. He said all the Creatures are the eternal praja or citizens of the Supreme Lord. He said the four Vedas which are Rigveda, Yajurveda, Samaveda and Atharvaveda are the only true uncorrupted sources of Dharma, revealed by the Supreme Lord, at the beginning of every creation, also because they are the only perfectly preserved knowledge without alterations using Sanskrit prosody or Chhandas and different techniques of counting the number of verses with different Vedic chanting techniques. He says, confusions regarding the Vedas arose due to the misinterpretations of the Vedas, and Vedas promote Science and asks Humans to discover the Ultimate Truth, which he has emphasised throughout his Commentary on the Vedas.

He accepted the teachings of the first ten Principal Upanishads also with Shvetashvatara Upanishad,  which explains the Adhyatma part of the Vedas. He further said, any source whatever, including Upanishads, should be considered and accepted to only that extent as they are in conformity with the teachings of the Vedas.

He accepted the six Vedanga texts which includes Grammar and the like required for the correct interpretation of the Vedas. Among Sanskrit Grammatical texts, he says, Bhagavan Pāṇini's Aṣṭādhyāyī and its commentary, Mahabhashya by Maharshi Patanjali are the current surviving valid texts, and all other surviving modern-grammatical texts should not be accepted as they are confusing, dishonest and will not help people in learning the Vedas easily.

He accepted all the six Darshana Shastras which includes Samkhya, Vaisheshika, Nyaya, Yoga Sutras of Patanjali, Purva Mimamsa Sutras, Vedanta sutras. Unlike other medieval Sanskrit scholars, Dayanand said all the six darshanas are not opponents but each throw light on different aspects required by the Creation. Hence they are all independent in their own right and all of them conform with the teachings of the Vedas. He says Acharya Kapila of Sankhya Darshan was not an atheist but it is the scholars who misinterpreted his sutras.

He said the books called Brahamana-Granthas such as Aitareya Brahmana, Shatapatha Brahmana, Sāma Brahamana, Gopatha Brahmana etc... which are authored by the seers to explain the meaning of the Vedas are also valid but again only to that extent as they agree with four Vedas because these texts are prone to interpolations by others. He said it is these books which are called by the names "Itihasa, Purana, Narashamsa, Kalpa, Gatha" since they contain information about life of Seers and incidents, they inform about the creation of the World etc...

He said the eighteen Puranas and the eighteen Upapuranas, are not the real Puranas and these are not authored by sage Vyasa, and they violate teachings of the Vedas and therefore they should not be accepted. The eighteen Puranas and Upapuranas are filled with contradictions, idol worships, incarnations and personification of God, temples, rituals and practises which are against the Vedas. In his book Satyarth Prakash, he says whatever 'good' present in these eighteen- Puranas and upapuranas, are already present in the Vedas and since they contain too many false informations which can mislead people, they should be rejected.

He points that the sage Vyasa was called so by the name "Vyasa" not because he divided the Vedas but indicates the "diameter or breadth" which means sage Veda Vyasa had studied the Vedas in great depth.

He lists out various texts which should not be treated as honest texts to develop one's understanding of the World and the Lord. He rejected "all" of the Tantric texts including Pancharatra. He said that these texts are not valid as they teach different customs, rituals and practises which are against the Vedas.

Maharshi Dayanand based his teachings on the Vedas which can be summarised as follows:
 There are three entities which are eternal: 1. The Supreme Lord or Paramatma, 2. The individual souls or Jivatmas, which are vast in number but not infinite, 3. Prakriti or the Nature.
 Prakṛti or Nature, which is the material cause of the Creation, is eternal and is characterised by Sattva, Rajas and Tamas, which tend to be in equilibrium. In every cycle of creation, the Conscious Supreme Lord will disturb its equilibrium and makes it useful for the creation of the Worlds and its forces and to manufacture the bodies required by the individual souls. After a specific long time called the day of the Brahma (Brahma means great, lengthy etc...), the creation would be dissolved and the Nature would be restored back to its equilibrium. After a period called the Night of Brahma, which is equal to the length of the day of the Brahma, the Creation would set forth again. This cycle of creation and dissolution has neither beginning nor end, hence the characteristic of the eternal.
 Jiva or Jivatma or Individual eternal Soul or Self, are many who are different from one another yet have the similar characteristics and can reach the 'same level' of Happiness in the state of Moksha or Liberation (explained below in another paragraph). They are not made out of Natural particles and are bodiless, beyond all genders and all other characteristics as seen in the World, but they acquire body made out of the Nature and it is known as taking 'birth'. These souls are subtler than the Nature itself, but take birth through body as per the creative principles set by the Supreme Lord based on their past karma, and they put effort to improve themselves. By realising oneself, the Nature, and the Supreme Lord, individual souls are liberated. But this realisation depends on their efforts and knowledge. They keep coming to the World, use Nature, obtain fruits of their actions and appear taking myriads of lives of different animals (It is not a one way direction but those who have attained higher intellectual bodies can also go back to lower forms based on their Karma or actions), they redo their actions, and are completely free to choose their actions, learn and relearn, attain Liberation. After the extensive long duration of Moksha or Liberation, would come back again into the World. Since this period of Moksha or Liberation is extremely long, it appears as though they never return or they never take birth again, by the other beings who are still in the World. Since they are eternal and are capable of working, these characteristics cannot be destroyed. They are timeless, eternal but are not Omniscients and hence cannot be the pervaders of entire Space.
 The Supreme Lord who is One without second like him, whose name is Om, is the efficient cause of the Universe. Lord's Chief characteristics being - Sat, Chit and Ananda i.e., "It exists", "Has Supreme Consciousness" and is "eternally Blissful". The Lord and his characteristics are the same. The Supreme Lord is ever present everywhere, whose characteristics are beyond the Nature or Prakriti, and pervades all the individual souls and the Nature. It is not characteristic of the Supreme Lord to take birth or incarnate. He is ever pure i.e., unmixed by the characteristics of the Nature and the individual souls. The Supreme Lord is bodiless, infinite, hence has no form and hence cannot be worshipped through idols but can only be reached by any being through Yogic Samadhi as advocated in the Vedas which is summarised in the Yoga Sutras of Patanjali. Since the Lord is bodiless and hence beyond all genders, the Vedas address him as Father, Mother, Friend, Cause of the Worlds, the maker etc... He is the subtlest entity which is subtler than Nature, Pervading and Filling the entire existence and Space. It is due to his subtleity that he could take hold of  Nature to create the Worlds and he proposes no difficulty for the motion of the Worlds in Space. Hence he is called Paramatman, which means 'Ultimate Pervader". There exists neither who is equal to him nor completely opposed to him. The idea of Satans, Ghosts, Demons etc... are foreign to the Vedas.
 He said the names Agni, Shiva, Vishnu, Brahma, Prajapati, Paramatma, Vishva, Vayu, etc... are the different characteristics of Supreme Lord and the meaning of each of the names should be obtained by Dhatupatha or Root (linguistics). And these names do not refer to any Puranic deities which are in practice. Also, certain names may also refer to the worldy elements which should be distinguished from their contexts.
 It is Maharshi Dayanand's mark of intellect that he could very easily reconcile the notion of Saguna and Nirguna charactertistics of the Supreme Lord. Saguna, he says, refers to characteristics of the Lord such as Pervasiveness, Omnipotency, Bliss, ultimate consciousness etc... And, Nirguna, he says, refers to those characteristics which do not characterise the Lord, example: of the Nature and the individual souls such as different states of existence, taking birth, etc... are not that of the Lord. Until his time, everybody understood 'Saguna' as 'With Form and body, Incarnation" and 'Nirguna' as 'Without form and body' states of the Lord.
 On Moksha or State of Liberation: Moksha does not refer to any characteristic place but it is the state of individual souls who have achieved Liberation. The Jivas or individual souls are characterised by four different states of existence which are: 1. Jagrat (Wakefulness), 2. Swapna (Dreamy state), 3. Sushupti (Deep Sleep) and 4. Turiya. It is in the fourth Turiya state, the individual souls exist without contact with the Nature but are conscious of their own selves, other individual souls and the Supreme Lord (or eternal Truth). This state of Moksha or Turiya is not seen in the World hence incomparable but can only be realised. In this state they are free of every tinge of Nature and possess their own minds and experience bliss, the pleasure of their freedom and the like, which are incomparable with any form of pleasure of the world. They are bodiless in that state and can attain any form of pleasure by their own will without requiring any external agent such as, for example they can perform the function of ears by their ownself without requiring material ears etc. In that state they are capable fulfilling of all their wishes, can go anywhere they want right then and there, can witness the creation, maintenance and dissolution of the Worlds, they also come in contact with other individuals who are liberated. But even in that state, the world-creative powers remain with the Supreme Lord. In Moksha, the individual souls are remain distinct from one another and from the Supreme Lord. And, by means of their own capability and with the Supreme Lord as their means, they enjoy the bliss. After the period of Moksha, they pass on to this World again, in support of which, he quotes Veda mantras and Mundakopanishad verses, in his book Satyarth Prakash and Rigvedaadi Bhashya Bhumika:
 Again, it is the mark of Maharshi Dayanand's wit that he reconciles the notion of Unending or Eternal Moksha. He says, the 'Eternal Moksha' or 'Ananta Moksha', refers to the 'permanency of pleasures of Moksha' unlike the momentary pleasures of the World, and does not necessarily mean the individual souls will remain in Moksha permanently. He clarifies it by saying that the individual souls are permanent and hence their characteristics also, and it is 'illogical' to consider that individual soul would get trapped in one of the moments of the beginningless time, and escape the World for eternity by using finite time period of his lives in different creature forms. Even if the illogical is accepted then also it means even before he got trapped in Creation, he was in Moksha and hence his Moksha period may fail at times is the conclusion which is contradictory to the assumption that the Moksha is for infinite period of time. Hence, the Vedic teaching that the individual souls should come back after liberation should be considered valid. In different point of view, he clarifies the same idea by saying that all actions whatever, done for a finite time period cannot yield infinite result or fruit-of-actions, and after the period of Moksha, the jivas or individual should would not have the capability to enjoy the bliss of Moksha further.
These, he said, are according to the Vedas and Upanishads and quotes verses from the Vedas.

Social Causes: He opposed Caste system, Sati practice, idol worships, child marriage, etc. which are against the spirit of the Vedas and advocated that all evils of society should be thoroughly investigated and should be removed. The Varnashrama is based on Education and Profession and in his book Satyarth Prakash, he quotes passages from Manusmriti, Grihya Sutras and Vedas which support his claims. He advocated the notion of Rashtra and One Government throughout the World, also known as Chakradhipatya.

Dayanand's mission 

 He believed that Hinduism had been corrupted by divergence from the founding principles of the Vedas and that Hindus had been misled by the priesthood for the priests' self-aggrandizement. For this mission, he founded the Arya Samaj, enunciating the Ten Universal Principles as a code for Universalism, called Krinvanto Vishwaryam. With these principles, he intended the whole world to be an abode for Aryas (Nobles).

His next step was to reform Hinduism with a new dedication to God. He travelled the country challenging religious scholars and priests to discussions, winning repeatedly through the strength of his arguments and knowledge of Sanskrit and Vedas. Hindu priests discouraged the laity from reading Vedic scriptures, and encouraged rituals, such as bathing in the Ganges River and feeding of priests on anniversaries, which Dayananda pronounced as superstitions or self-serving practices. By exhorting the nation to reject such superstitious notions, his aim was to educate the nation to return to the teachings of the Vedas, and to follow the Vedic way of life. He also exhorted Hindus to accept social reforms, including the importance of cows for national prosperity as well as the adoption of Hindi as the national language for national integration. Through his daily life and practice of yoga and asanas, teachings, preaching, sermons and writings, he inspired Hindus to aspire for Swarajya (self governance), nationalism, and spiritualism. He advocated the equal rights and respects to women and advocated for the education of all children, regardless of gender.

Dayanand also made critical analyses of faiths including Christianity & Islam, as well as of other Indian faiths like Jainism, Buddhism and Sikhism. In addition to discouraging idolatry in Hinduism, he was also against what he considered to be the corruption of the true and pure faith in his own country. Unlike many other reform movements of his times within Hinduism, the Arya Samaj's appeal was addressed not only to the educated few in India, but to the world as a whole as evidenced in the sixth principle of the Arya Samaj. As a result, his teachings professed universalism for all the living beings and not for any particular sect, faith, community or nation.

Arya Samaj allows and encourages converts to Hinduism. Dayananda's concept of dharma is stated in the "Beliefs and Disbeliefs" section of Satyartha Prakash, he says:

Dayananda's Vedic message emphasized respect and reverence for other human beings, supported by the Vedic notion of the divine nature of the individual. In the ten principles of the Arya Samaj, he enshrined the idea that "All actions should be performed with the prime objective of benefiting mankind", as opposed to following dogmatic rituals or revering idols and symbols. The first five principles speak of Truth, while the last five speak of a society with nobility, civics, co-living, and disciplined life. In his own life, he interpreted moksha to be a lower calling, as it argued for benefits to the individual, rather than calling to emancipate others.

Dayananda's "back to the Vedas" message influenced many thinkers and philosophers the world over.

Activities

Dayanand Saraswati is recorded to have been active since he was 14, which time he was able to recite religious verses and teach about them. He was respected at the time for taking part in religious debates. His debates were attended by large crowds.

On 22 October 1869 in Varanasi, where he won a debate against 27 scholars and 12 expert pandits. The debate was said to have been attended by over 50,000 people. The main topic was "Do the Vedas uphold deity worship?"

Arya Samaj 

Dayananda Saraswati's creation, the Arya Samaj, condemned practices of several different religions and communities, including such practices as idol worship, animal sacrifice, pilgrimages, priest craft, offerings made in temples, the castes, child marriages, meat eating and discrimination against women. He argued that all of these practices ran contrary to good sense and the wisdom of the Vedas.

Views on superstitions 

He severely criticized practices which he considered to be superstitions, including sorcery, and astrology, which were prevalent in India at the time. Below are several quotes from his book, Sathyarth Prakash:

On Astrology, he wrote,

He makes a clear distinction between Jyotisha Shaastra and astrology, calling astrology a fraud.

Views on other religions 

He considered the prevalent religions to have either immoral stories, or badly practised, or some of them have sufficiently moved away from the Vedas. In his book Satyarth Prakash, Maharshi Dayanand has analysed critically current form of Hinduism, Jainism, Buddhism, Christianity and Islam.

Islam

He viewed Islam to be waging wars and immorality. He doubted that Islam had anything to do with the God, and questioned why a God would hate every non-believer, allowing the slaughter of animals, and command Muhammad to slaughter innocent people.

He further described Muhammad as "imposter", and one who held out "a bait to men and women, in the name of God, to compass his own selfish needs". He regarded Quran as "Not the Word of God. It is a human work. Hence it cannot be believed in".

Christianity

His analysis of the Bible was based on an attempt to compare it with scientific evidence, morality, and other properties. His analysis claimed that the Bible contains many stories and precepts that are immoral, praising cruelty, deceit and that encourage sin. One commentary notes many alleged discrepancies and fallacies of logic in the Bible e.g. that God fearing Adam eating the fruit of life and becoming his equal displays jealousy. His critique attempts to show logical fallacies in the Bible, and throughout he asserts that the events depicted in the Bible portray God as a man rather than an omniscient, omnipotent or complete being.

He opposed the perpetual virginity of Mary, adding that such doctrines are simply against the nature of law, and that God would never break his own law because God is omniscient and infallible.

Sikhism

He regarded Guru Nanak as "rogue", who was quite ignorant about Vedas, Sanskrit, Shashtra, and otherwise Nanak wouldn't be mistaken with words.

He further said that followers of Sikhism are to be blamed for making up stories that Nanak possessed miraculous powers and met Gods. He criticized Guru Gobind Singh and other Gurus, saying they "invented fictitious stories", although he also recognized Gobind Singh to be "indeed a very brave man."

Jainism

He regarded Jainism as "a most dreadful religion", writing that Jains were intolerant and hostile towards the non-Jains.

Buddhism

Dayanand described Buddhism as "anti-vedic" and "atheistic." He noted that the type of "salvation" Buddhism prescribes, is attainable even to dogs and donkeys. He further criticized the Buddhist cosmology which says that earth was not created.

Assassination attempts

Dayananda was subjected to many unsuccessful assassination attempts on his life.

According to his supporters, he was poisoned on a few occasions, but due to his regular practice of Hatha Yoga he survived all such attempts. One story tells that attackers once attempted to drown him in a river, but Dayananda dragged the assailants into the river instead, though he released them before they drowned.

Another account claims that he was attacked by Muslims who were offended by his criticism of Islam while meditating on the Ganges river. They threw him into the water but he is claimed to have saved himself because his pranayama practice allowed him to stay under water until the attackers left.

Assassination 

In 1883, the Maharaja of Jodhpur, Jaswant Singh II, invited Dayananda to stay at his palace. The Maharaja was eager to become Dayananda's disciple and to learn his teachings. Dayananda went to the Maharaja's restroom during his stay and saw him with a dancing girl named Nanhi Jaan. Dayananda asked the Maharaja to forsake the girl and all unethical acts and to follow the dharma like a true Arya (noble). Dayananda's suggestion offended Nanhi, who decided to take revenge.

On 29 September 1883, she bribed Dayananda's cook, Jagannath, to mix small pieces of glass in his nightly milk. Dayananda was served glass-laden milk before bed, which he promptly drank, becoming bedridden for several days, and suffering excruciating pain. The Maharaja quickly arranged doctor's services for him. However, by the time doctors arrived, his condition had worsened, and he had developed large bleeding sores. Upon seeing Dayananda's suffering, Jagannath was overwhelmed with guilt and confessed his crime to Dayananda. On his deathbed, Dayananda forgave him, and gave him a bag of money, telling him to flee the kingdom before he was found and executed by the Maharaja's men.

Later, the Maharaja arranged for him to be sent to Mount Abu as per the advice of Residency, however, after staying for some time in Abu, on 26 October 1883, he was sent to Ajmer for better medical care. There was no improvement in his health and he died on the morning of the Hindu festival of Diwali on 30 October 1883 chanting mantras.

Cremation and commemoration

Rishi Udyan, which has a functional Arya Samaj temple with daily morning and evening yajna homa, is located on the banks of Ana Sagar Lake off the NH58 Ajmer-Pushkar Highway. An annual 3 day Arya Samaj melā is held every year at Rishi Udyan on Rishi Dayanand's death anniversary at the end of October, which also entails vedic seminars, vedas memorisation competition, yajna, and Dhavaja Rohan flag march. It is organized by the Paropkarini Sabha, which was founded by Swami Dayanand Saraswati on 16 August 1880 in Meerut, registered in Ajmer on 27 February 1883, and since 1893 has been operating from its office in Ajmer.

Every year on Maha Shivaratri, Arya Samajis celebrate Rishi Bodh Utsav during the 2 days mela at Tankara organized by Tankara Trust, during which Shobha Yatra procession and Maha Yajna is held; event is also attended by the Prime Minister of India Narendra Modi and Chief Minister of Gujarat Vijay Rupani.

Navlakha Mahal inside Gulab Bagh and Zoo at Udaipur is also associated with him where he wrote the second edition of his seminal work, Satyarth Prakash, in Samvat 1939 (1882-83 CE).

Legacy

Maharshi Dayanand University in Rohtak, Maharshi Dayanand Saraswati University in Ajmer, DAV University (Dayanand Anglo-Vedic Schools System) in Jalandhar are named after him. So are over 800 schools and colleges under D.A.V. College Managing Committee, including Dayanand College at Ajmer. Industrialist Nanji Kalidas Mehta built the Maharshi Dayanand Science College and donated it to the Education Society of Porbandar, after naming it after Dayananda Saraswati.

Dayananda Saraswati is most notable for influencing the freedom movement of India. His views and writings have been used by different writers, including Shyamji Krishna Varma, who founded India House in London and guided other notable figures that were was influenced by him; Subhas Chandra Bose; Lala Lajpat Rai; Madam Cama; Vinayak Damodar Savarkar; Lala Hardayal; Madan Lal Dhingra; Ram Prasad Bismil; Mahadev Govind Ranade; Swami Shraddhanand; S. Satyamurti; Pandit Lekh Ram; Mahatma Hansraj; and others.

He also had a notable influence on Bhagat Singh. Singh, after finishing primary school, had joined the Dayanand Anglo Vedic Middle School, of Mohan Lal road, in Lahore. Sarvapalli Radhakrishnan, on Shivratri day, 24 February 1964, wrote about Dayananda:

The places Dayanand visited during his life were often changed culturally as a result. Jodhpur adopted Hindi as main language, and later the present day Rajasthan did the same. Other admirers included Swami Vivekananda, Ramakrishna, Bipin Chandra Pal, Vallabhbhai Patel, Syama Prasad Mookerjee, and Romain Rolland, who regarded Dayananda as a remarkable and unique figure.

American Spiritualist Andrew Jackson Davis described Dayanand's influence on him, calling Dayanand a "Son of God", and applauding him for restoring the status of the Nation. Sten Konow, a Swedish scholar noted that Dayanand revived the history of India.

Others who were notably influenced by him include Ninian Smart, and Benjamin Walker.

Works 

Dayananda Saraswati wrote more than 60 works. This includes a 16-volume explanation of the six Vedangas, an incomplete commentary on the Ashtadhyayi (Panini's grammar), several small tracts on ethics and morality, Vedic rituals and sacraments, and a piece on the analysis of rival doctrines (such as Advaita Vedanta, Islam and Christianity). Some of his major works include the Satyarth Prakash, Satyarth Bhumika, Sanskarvidhi, Rigvedadi Bhashya Bhumika, Rigved Bhashyam (up to 7/61/2)and Yajurved Bhashyam. The Paropakarini Sabha located in the Indian city of Ajmer was founded by Saraswati to publish and preach his works and Vedic texts. He was also a socio religious reformer who lived in the 19th century in India.

Complete list of works 

 Sandhya (Unavailable) (1863)
 Bhagwat Khandan OR Paakhand Khandan OR Vaishnavmat Khandan (1866) which criticised the Srimad Bhagavatam
 Advaitmat Khandan which criticised Advaita Vedanta
 Panchmahayajya Vidhi (1874 & 1877)
 Satyarth Prakash (1875 & 1884)
 Vedanti Dhwant Nivaran (1875) which criticised Vedanta philosophy
 Vedviruddh mat Khandan OR Vallabhacharya mat Khandan (1875) which criticised Shuddhadvaita philosophy 
 ShikshaPatri Dhwant Nivaran OR Swaminarayan Mat Khandan (1875) which criticised the Shikshapatri
 Ved Bhashyam Namune ka PRATHAM Ank (1875) 
 Ved Bhashyam Namune ka DWITIYA Ank (1876)
 Aryabhivinaya (Incomplete) (1876)
 Sanskarvidhi (1877 & 1884)
 Aaryoddeshya Ratna Maala (1877)
 RigvedAadi Bhasya Bhumika (1878) which is a foreword on his commentary on the Vedas 
 Rigved Bhashyam (7/61/1,2 only) (Incomplete) (1877 to 1899) which is a commentary on the Rigveda according to his interpretation 
 Yajurved Bhashyam (Complete) (1878 to 1889) which is a commentary on the Yajurveda according to his interpretation 
 Asthadhyayi Bhashya (2 Parts) (Incomplete) (1878 to 1879) which is a commentary on Panini's Astadhyayi according to his interpretation 

 Vedang Prakash (Set of 16 Books)
 Varnoccharan Shiksha (1879)
 Sanskrit Vakyaprabodhini (1879)
 VyavaharBhanu (1879)
 Sandhi Vishay
 Naamik
 Kaarak
 Saamaasik
 Taddhit
 Avyayaarth
 Aakhyatik
 Sauvar
 PaariBhaasik
 Dhatupath
 Ganpaath
 Unaadikosh
 Nighantu

 Gautam Ahilya ki katha (Unavailable) (1879)
 Bhrantinivaran (1880)
 Bhrmocchedan (1880)
 AnuBhrmocchedan (1880)
 Go Karuna Nidhi (1880) which contains his views on cow slaughter in India
 Chaturved Vishay Suchi (1971) 
 Gadarbh Taapni Upnishad (As per Babu Devendranath Mukhopadhyay) (Unavailable)
 Hugli Shastrarth tatha Pratima Pujan Vichar (1873) which is a record of his arguments with orthodox pundits at Bengal & his views regarding validity of idol worship in Hinduism  
 Jaalandhar Shastrarth (1877) which is a record of his arguments with orthodox pundits at Jalandhar
 Satyasatya Vivek (Bareily Shastrarth) (1879) which is a record of his arguments with orthodox pundits at Bareily
 Satyadharm Vichar (Mela Chandapur) (1880) which is a record of his arguments with Muslim & Christian theologians at an inter-faith dialogue held in Chandapur of Shahjahanpur district
 Kashi Shastrarth (1880) which is a record of his arguments with orthodox pundits at Varanasi
Note:- For other miscellaneous Shastrarth please read 1.Dayanand Shastrarth Sangrah published by Arsh Sahitya Prachar Trust, Delhi and 2. Rishi Dayanand ke Shastrarth evam Pravachan published by Ramlal Kapoor Trust Sonipat (Haryana).
 Arya Samaj ke Niyam aur Upniyam (30 November 1874) which deals with code of conduct for the Arya Samaj
 Updesh Manjari (Puna Pravachan) (4 July 1875) which is a record of his sermons delivered to his followers at Pune
 Swami Dayanand dwara swakathit Janm Charitra (During Puna pravachan) (4 August 1875) which is a record of his early life spoken by himself to his followers at Pune
 Maharshi Dayanand Saraswati Jivan Charitra Photo Gallery
 Swami Dayanand dwara swakathit Janm Charitra, for the Theosophist Society's monthly Journal: Nov & 1 Dec
 Rishi Dayanand ke Patra aur Vigyapan which is a collection of the letters & pamphlets written by him.

See also
 Cow protection movement
 Swami Shraddhanand
 Sudhakar Chaturvedi

References

Bibliography

Satyarth Prakash

Further reading

 Dayananda Saraswati, Founder of Arya Samaj, by Arjan Singh Bawa. Published by Ess Ess Publications, 1979 (1st edition:1901).
 Indian Political Tradition, by D.K Mohanty. Published by Anmol Publications PVT. LTD. . Chapter 4: Dayananda Saraswati Page 92.
 Rashtra Pitamah Swami Dayanand Saraswati by Rajender Sethi (M R Sethi Educational Trust Chandigarh 2006)
 Aurobindo Ghosh, in Bankim Tilak Dayanand (Calcutta 1947 p 1, 39)
 Arya Samaj And The Freedom Movement by K C Yadav & K S Arya -Manohar Publications Delhi 1988
 The Prophets of the New India, Romain Rolland p. 97 (1930)
 Satyarth Prakash (1875) Light of Truth – first English translation 1908 The Light of Truth Light of Truht [i.e. Truth]: Or, An English Translation of the Satyarth Prakash, the Well-known Work of Swami Dayananda Saraswati
 R̥gvedādi-bhāṣya-bhūmikā / An Introduction to the Commentary on the Vedas. ed. B. Ghasi Ram, Meerut (1925). reprints 1981, 1984 Glorious Thoughts of Swami Dayananda: Being a Treasury of Several Thousand Inspiring and Valuable Thoughts of the Great Social Reformer Classified Under Several Hundered [sic] Subjects 
 Glorious Thoughts of Swami Dayananda. ed. New Book Society of India, 1966 
 An introduction to the commentary on the Vedas. Jan Gyan-Prakashan, 1973. An Introduction To The Commentary On The VEDAS: Dayananda Flipkart.com review
 Autobiography, ed. Kripal Chandra Yadav, New Delhi : Manohar, 1978. Autobiography of dayanand saraswati 
 Yajurvēda bhāṣyam : Samskr̥tabhāṣyaṃ, Āndhraṭīkātātparyaṃ, Āṅglabhāvārthasahitaṅgā, ed. Mar̲r̲i Kr̥ṣṇāreḍḍi, Haidarābād : Vaidika Sāhitya Pracāra Samiti, 2005.
 The philosophy of religion in India, Delhi : Bharatiya Kala Prakashan, 2005, 
 Prem Lata, Swami Dayananda Sarasvati (1990) Swami Dayānanda Sarasvatī
 Autobiography of Swami Dayanand Saraswati (1976) Autobiography of Swami Dayanand Saraswati
 M. Ruthven, Fundamentalism: A Very Short Introduction, Oxford University Press, USA (2007), .
 N. A. Salmond, Hindu Iconoclasts: Rammohun Roy, Dayananda Sarasvati and nineteenth-century polemics against Idolatry (2004) Hindu Iconoclasts: Rammohun Roy, Dayananda Sarasvati, and Nineteenth-Century Polemics Against Idolatry

 'THE RENAISSANCE RISHI' By Brigadier Chitranjan Sawant,VSM THE RENAISSANCE RISHI by brigadier chitranjan swant,VSM : www.Aryasamajjamnagar.org

External links
 

  
 
 Dayanand Saraswati (1824–1883)
 Life and Teaching of Swami Dayanand at Internet Archive

 

1824 births
1883 deaths
People from Rajkot district
Gujarati people
Arya Samajis
Founders of new religious movements
19th-century Hindu philosophers and theologians
Hindu reformers
Indian autobiographers
Indian murder victims
Indian reformers
Indian Hindu saints
Critics of Islam
Critics of Christianity
Critics of Jainism
Critics of Sikhism
Critics of Buddhism
Anti-caste activists
19th-century Indian philosophers
Social leaders
Hindu critics of Islam